Jamiat Ulema-e-Islam Pakistan (JUIP) is a political party in Pakistan. It was established on 29 December 2020 as a breakway faction of Jamiat Ulema-e-Islam (F) (JUI-F), which was led by Fazl-ur-Rehman. The founder and chairman of JUIP is Muhammad Khan Sherani.

On 31 March 2021, Sherani met Fazl-ur-Rehman to inquire about his health and make suggestions to resolve the differences between their parties. "If Fazl acts on our suggestions, we will join him again," Sherani said.

Alliance with Imran Khan's PTI
On 13 June 2022, Sherani met with Imran Khan and declared an alliance with his party, the Pakistan Tehreek-e-Insaf.

Sherani also took to Twitter and said that when he asked Fazl ur-Rehman does he have proof that Imran Khan is a Jewish and Indian agent, the latter responded with "it's just a political statement".

See also
Jamiat Ulema-e-Islam
Jamiat Ulema-e-Islam (F)

References

Political parties in Pakistan
Jamiat Ulema-e-Islam
Islamic political parties in Pakistan
Far-right political parties in Pakistan
Deobandi organisations
2020 establishments in Pakistan
Political parties established in 2020